British India Steam Navigation Co v Inland Revenue Commissioners (1881) 7 QBD 165 is a case relevant for UK commercial law and UK insolvency law case, concerning the definition of a debenture.

Facts
The British India Steam Navigation Company had undertaken on paper to pay the holder £100 on 30 November 1882 and pay interest half yearly at 5% pa. The paper said these were “debentures”. Meanwhile, the Stamp Act 1870, a taxation statute, said that “debentures” were subject to a higher rate of stamp duty. The company then tried to argue that in fact these were not debentures at all, and merely a “promissory note”.  A. V. Dicey and Farrer Herschell QC appeared for the Revenue.

Judgment
Lindley J held that the instruments were debentures and therefore subject to stamp duty. They were debentures because they were documents that acknowledged a debt.

See also

UK insolvency law

Notes

References
L Sealy and S Worthington, Cases and Materials in Company Law (8th edn OUP 2008) 460

United Kingdom company case law
United Kingdom insolvency case law
United Kingdom taxation case law
High Court of Justice cases
1881 in British law
1881 in case law